Silver Lake is an unincorporated community and census-designated place (CDP) located within Hope Township in Warren County, New Jersey, United States, that was defined as part of the 2010 United States Census. As of the 2010 Census, the CDP's population was 368.

Geography
According to the United States Census Bureau, the CDP had a total area of 0.995 square miles (2.575 km2), including 0.993 square miles (2.571 km2) of land and 0.002 square miles (0.004 km2) of water (0.16%).

Demographics

Census 2010

References

Census-designated places in Warren County, New Jersey
Hope Township, New Jersey